Reith bei Seefeld is a municipality in the district of Innsbruck-Land in the Austrian state of Tyrol located 12.3 km northwest of Innsbruck and 3 km south of Seefeld in Tirol. The village was founded in 1350. At that time stone oil (=petroleum) was found and is used for healing purposes until now.

Population

References

External links

Cities and towns in Innsbruck-Land District